Paullus Aemilius Regillus or Regulus (born around 15/14 BC) was a Roman Senator and grandnephew of the emperor Augustus.

Biography

Early life
He was the son of the consul and censor Paullus Aemilius Lepidus and Claudia Marcella the Younger, who was a daughter of Octavia the Younger and thus a niece of the Roman emperor Augustus. From his father's previous marriage, Regillus had two half-brothers and one half-sister. He was born  15 BC/14 BC. His father died shortly after his birth, and his mother subsequently remarried. Regillus was born and raised in Rome. Through his half-brother Marcus Valerius Messalla Barbatus, he was the uncle to the Roman Empress Valeria Messallina.

Career
Regillus' political career was contemporaneous with the rule of the Roman emperors Augustus and Tiberius, during which he served as a quaestor. During the reign of Tiberius (14 to 37), Regillus was one of the emperor's comites, an imperial legate and proconsul of a Roman province. According to inscriptional evidence, Regillus was patron of Saguntum.

References

Sources
 
 
 
 
 

1st-century BC Romans
1st-century Romans
Regillus, Paullus
Julio-Claudian dynasty
Senators of the Roman Empire
14 BC births
15 BC births